Neil Warnock (born 1 December 1948) is an English football manager and former player. He is the current manager of Championship club Huddersfield Town. He is also a television and radio pundit. In a managerial career spanning five decades, Warnock has managed sixteen different clubs from the Premier League to non-league. He holds the record for the most promotions in English football, with eight.

Warnock played as a winger for Chesterfield, Rotherham United, Hartlepool United, Scunthorpe United, Aldershot, Barnsley, York City and Crewe Alexandra, scoring 36 goals in 327 career league appearances. He retired from league football in 1979, aged 30. His playing career continued in the 1979–1980 season with non-league Burton Albion making 9 appearances and scoring 6 goals until an injury cut his season short. He finally hung up his boots when returning to Burton Albion as player manager in the 1981-1982 season, playing in 29 games and scoring 3 goals, before concentrating on management for the rest of his time at Burton.

Warnock's first managerial job was with non-League Gainsborough Trinity (1980–1981), he would subsequently manage Burton Albion (1981–1986) and Scarborough (1986–1989), winning promotion to the Football League with the latter in 1987. He then managed Notts County (1989–1993), leading them from the Third Division to the First Division in successive seasons, though he was sacked after the club were relegated the season before the First Division became known as the Championship. After a brief spell at Torquay United (1993), he moved to Huddersfield Town (1993–1995), with whom he won promotion to the new First Division. He then resigned and joined Plymouth Argyle (1995–1997), leading them to the Second Division. After being dismissed, he spent spells with Oldham Athletic (1997–1998) and Bury (1998–1999).

In 1999, Warnock joined boyhood club Sheffield United, leading them to the semi-finals of the League Cup and FA Cup in 2003 and promotion to the Premier League in 2006. However, he resigned in 2007 after the club were relegated. He then took over at Crystal Palace (2007–2010), saving the club from relegation to League One. When the club went into administration, he left to join Queens Park Rangers (2010–2012), winning promotion to the Premier League with the club in 2011. He was sacked with the club in a precarious position and joined Leeds United (2012–2013). After being dismissed by Leeds following a poor run of form, he was without a club for almost fifteen months until returning to Crystal Palace, then in the Premier League, in August 2014. In December 2014, he was sacked by Crystal Palace after a poor start to the season, which saw the club in the relegation zone. After a month as caretaker at Queens Park Rangers, Warnock returned to Rotherham United as manager in February 2016. He was appointed manager of Cardiff City in October 2016, and led them to Premier League promotion during the 2017–18 season. Warnock became manager of Middlesbrough in June 2020, a role he held until his departure in November 2021. Warnock announced his retirement from football management in April 2022 after 42 years as a manager. He later came out of retirement in February 2023 to manage  Huddersfield Town on a short-term contract.

Playing career
After a brief stint working in a local undertakers Warnock started his professional playing career with Chesterfield in 1967, before moving on to Rotherham United, Hartlepool United, Scunthorpe United, Aldershot, Barnsley, York City and Crewe Alexandra, making a total of 327 league appearances in an 11-year playing career. At Hartlepool, he won the club's Player of the Season award in 1972. He finished his football league career at Crewe Alexandra in 1979, aged only 30. His playing career continued at Burton Albion in 1979 which was cut short with an injury and continued when he re-joined Burton as player-manager in 1981–1982, before concentrating on management for the rest of his time at Burton.

Managerial career

Early spells
After being involved in Sunday League coaching, his first full managerial job was with Northern Premier League side Gainsborough Trinity in 1981. Following this he managed Burton Albion and Scarborough. At Scarborough he and Paul Evans, his assistant, won the Football Conference title in 1987, making them the first team to win automatic promotion to the Football League following the abolition of the re-election system.

Warnock had earlier spent time as a coach at Peterborough United, where he met Posh assistant boss Mick Jones. In late 1988, Warnock became manager of Notts County – then in the Third Division – with Jones as his assistant. Also joining the backroom staff were Warnock's assistant at Scarborough, Paul Evans, and ex-Scarborough physio Dave Wilson. The four helped County achieve successive promotions to reach the First Division for the 1991–92 season, with Warnock turning down lucrative offers to manage Chelsea and Sunderland during this time. Warnock, however, was dismissed in January 1993 after County's relegation had cost them a place in the new Premier League.

In March 1993, Warnock took over as "consultant" at Torquay United, saving the club from relegation from the Football League. Warnock resumed his partnership with Jones, Evans and Wilson at Huddersfield Town, his appointment coming in July 1993.

Warnock was quick to inject new blood into the Terriers' side, snapping up goalkeeper Steve Francis, Darren Bullock, Ronnie Jepson, Tom Cowan and Pat Scully during his first season, all of whom would go on to become mainstays in the 1994–95 promotion season. He also showed faith in Centre of Excellence products such as Chris Billy, Simon Baldry and Andy Booth – a player then struggling to make the breakthrough who would go on to become a club legend in modern times. Despite these acquisitions, Town struggled for most of the 1993–94 season, their last at Leeds Road, and Warnock was quick to offload fan favourites Iwan Roberts, Iffy Onoura and Chris Marsden while introducing a more direct style of play. The run to the 1994 Football League Trophy Final (lost on penalties to Swansea City) coincided with an upturn in league form and a mass optimism further bolstered by the move to the new Alfred McAlpine Stadium for the 1994–95 season. Warnock's side won the Yorkshire Electricity Cup in late 1994. Warnock's side were genuine contenders for automatic promotion until falling away in the final few games to finish 5th (the final play-off spot that season owing to league re-structuring). They triumphed on penalties over second-placed Brentford after two thrilling ties and went on to beat Bristol Rovers at Wembley Stadium. He quit Huddersfield just days after their promotion, but made a swift and surprising return to management at Plymouth Argyle, who had just been relegated to Division Three.

In his first season as manager of Plymouth Argyle, Warnock took the club to Division Three play-off glory after finishing fourth in the league. The play-off semi-final was a memorable affair – Argyle played Colchester United and were 1–0 down from the first leg, but won 3–1 at Home Park in the second leg. During this game, Warnock was sent off from the dug-out. Warnock responded to this by jumping into the crowd to watch the remainder of the match with the Argyle supporters.

The final was the first match that the club had played at Wembley. A header from Ronnie Mauge on 65 minutes gave Argyle a 1–0 win over Darlington and promotion to Division Two. In February 1997, Warnock was surprisingly sacked as Argyle manager despite his popularity with the supporters. Following this successful spell, Warnock rounded out the 1990s with two relegations, first at Oldham Athletic in the 1996–97 season, and then in 1998–99 at Bury.

Sheffield United

Warnock was appointed as manager of his boyhood club Sheffield United on 2 December 1999. In 2002–03, Warnock led Sheffield United to the semi-finals of the League Cup and FA Cup, only to lose to Liverpool and Arsenal respectively, as well as the First Division play-off final, with the Blades beaten 3–0 by Wolverhampton Wanderers. This was the first time in his management career that he had lost a play-off contest, as he had achieved four promotions via the playoffs in the 1990s.

In 2005, Jones resumed the partnership by taking up the assistant's post at Bramall Lane, and at the end of the 2005–06 season, the club were promoted to the Premier League as runners-up in The Championship.

The Blades performed well in their expected relegation battle, and for a long time looked to be heading for survival. However, a turning point in the season occurred with victories for both West Ham United against Manchester United and Wigan Athletic on the final day of the season, condemning Warnock's side to relegation. Warnock wrote in his autobiography that minutes after the final game of the season, actor and Blades fan Sean Bean burst into his office, blaming Warnock for the team's relegation in a "foul-mouthed tirade" while Warnock's wife and daughter were present. Bean denied this, calling Warnock "bitter" and "hypocritical", and arguing that he would never use such language in front of another man's wife and children. Warnock resigned from the club following relegation to take some time out of football.

A major factor that caused Sheffield United's relegation was that West Ham beat Manchester United on the final day of the season 1–0, with the goal scored by Carlos Tevez, whose contract was in question over third party ownership and who then signed for the champions the very next season. While all of this was happening, the Blades played Wigan at Bramall Lane and needed only one point to stay up; however, with the score at 1–1, a penalty was awarded to Wigan in injury time at the end of the first half – David Unsworth converted. The scoreline remained the same till the final whistle, sending the Blades back to the Championship after only one season.

Crystal Palace

Warnock spoke to Milan Mandarić about the vacant managerial role at Leicester City in the summer, but was never handed the job. Simon Jordan spoke to Warnock about taking over at Crystal Palace following the sacking of Peter Taylor and, after initially not being keen over the job, he returned to football management with Palace on 11 October 2007. Having his personal friend Simon Jordan as owner and chairman was certainly a help in him getting the job. Jones returned from his own sabbatical to join Warnock's team as assistant. Under Warnock and Jones, Palace made a massive turn-around, moving from relegation battlers to promotion contenders in the space of six months, with Warnock's use of youngsters a major factor in the improved performances and results. Palace made the play-offs in the end, but were beaten at the semi-final stage by Bristol City, who went on to lose to Hull City in the final.

Warnock stayed on for the 2008–09 season, but on taking the job a year earlier he had made it clear that the Crystal Palace job would be his last managerial role in football, with the club's finances beginning to take a turn for the worse. The 2009–10 season saw Palace perform well despite being heavily restricted by the club's poor financial position, which resulted in the club being placed in administration late in January. A ten-point deduction was imposed by the Football League for this. Crystal Palace's administrator commented that Warnock was "let go" after telling the administrator he did not have the stomach for the fight to save the club.

Queens Park Rangers
On 1 March 2010, Warnock joined Queens Park Rangers as manager on a three-and-a-half-year deal after agreeing compensation with Crystal Palace. His first match in charge was an emphatic 3–1 home win against West Bromwich Albion.

He helped QPR comfortably avoid relegation in 2009–10 – including a 2–0 win against former club Crystal Palace at Selhurst Park. Warnock was awarded Manager of the Month for August 2010. Using a new 4–2–3–1 formation built around playmaker Adel Taarabt (who went on to win the Football League Championship Player of the Year 2011), QPR topped the table for the majority of the 2010–11 season and on 30 April 2011 were promoted as Championship champions after a 2–0 win over Watford.

Despite leading the club to the Premier League for the first time in 15 years, he was sacked on 8 January 2012 after the 1–2 home defeat to Norwich City on 2 January 2012. The owner of QPR, Tony Fernandes, said that the club slipped down to a dangerous league position (17th) after recent results. Warnock said, "Obviously I'm very disappointed but, having achieved so much, I leave the club with a great sense of pride. I have enjoyed my time here more than anywhere else and the QPR fans have been brilliant with me – they deserve success. My biggest regret is that the takeover didn't happen earlier, because that would have given me the opportunity to bring in the targets I'd pinpointed all last summer and probably given us a better chance to succeed in the Premier League. The board at QPR are hugely ambitious and I wish them every success for the future. I've been involved in the game a long time and I will be spending the immediate future with my family and friends before deciding my next career move."

Leeds United
On 18 February 2012, Warnock joined Leeds as manager on a one-and-a-half-year deal taking him up to the end of the 2012–13 season. Before officially taking charge from caretaker manager Neil Redfearn he oversaw Leeds win 3–2 against Doncaster Rovers from the stands on 18 February with Warnock revealing he spoke to the players before the game and at half-time. On 28 February 2012, Warnock made his first signing as Leeds manager by bringing in Danny Webber, whom he managed while at Sheffield United.

Leeds would go on to finish 14th in the Championship and during the summer of 2012 Warnock revamped the entire Leeds team with several new signings. Warnock started the 2012–13 season with a home win in the League Cup beating Shrewsbury Town 4–0. Leeds would then go on to beat Wolves 1–0 at Elland Road on the opening day of the Championship.

After a string of defeats and Leeds sitting five points off the relegation zone, Warnock parted company with the club on 1 April 2013.

Return to Crystal Palace
On 27 August 2014, it was announced that Warnock would be appointed for a second spell in charge at Crystal Palace following the departure of Tony Pulis. However, after a poor run of form, and Crystal Palace ending up in the bottom three, Warnock was sacked by the club on 27 December 2014. He was succeeded by Alan Pardew on 2 January 2015.

In 2015, Warnock returned to Queens Park Rangers as first team advisor. On 4 November, he was placed in temporary charge of QPR following the departure of Chris Ramsey from the club.

Rotherham United
On 11 February 2016, Neil Warnock was confirmed as the new Rotherham United manager for the remainder of the 2015–16 season, replacing Neil Redfearn. Warnock drew his first game in charge with a 0–0 draw against Birmingham City in a match which saw both Richard Wood and Joe Mattock sent off. He then lost his next two games, against Reading and Burnley, 2–0. Rotherham then went on an unbeaten run of 11 matches, including wins against Brentford (2–1), Sheffield Wednesday (1–0), Middlesbrough (1–0), drawing against Derby County 3–3 after being 3–0 down with eight minutes to go, and winning 1–0 at Portman Road against Ipswich Town. Warnock was awarded the Championship Manager of the Month for March. The final win of the run was at Milton Keynes Dons, where a 4–0 thrashing all but sealed Rotherham's survival in the Championship at the expense of their opponents. The season closed with Warnock stating he wanted one last season managing in the Championship and Rotherham hoping to secure his services for 2016–17.

Despite not staying on as Rotherham manager beyond the end of the season, Warnock later said that keeping Rotherham in the division was the biggest achievement in his managerial career.

Cardiff City

On 5 October 2016, Warnock was appointed first team manager of Cardiff City. They finished in 12th place in the Championship in Warnock's first season in charge. On 6 May 2018, Warnock guided Cardiff to promotion to the Premier League after a 0–0 draw against Reading. With this promotion Warnock became the first manager to win eight promotions in the professional leagues. 

In January 2019, Warnock said that he considered retirement following the disappearance and eventual death of Emiliano Sala, who he had signed for a club record £15m from FC Nantes that month. However, he was unable to keep the team up and Cardiff were relegated back to the Championship at the end of the season. Warnock left Cardiff on 11 November after just over three years as manager; his final match was a home loss to Bristol City. He described his time at Cardiff as some of the best days in his career.

Middlesbrough

On 23 June 2020, Warnock was appointed manager of Championship club Middlesbrough, with the club only outside the Championship relegation zone on goal difference after 38 games. He replaced Jonathan Woodgate who was sacked from his first job in management after less than a year in charge. In his first game in charge, on 27 June, Middlesbrough beat Stoke City 2–0 to climb to 19th in the league. Having been 21st in the table when Warnock took over, they finished 17th in the league. Although initially on a short-term contract, Warnock confirmed that he would continue as manager for the 2020–21 season. On 17 September 2020, Middlesbrough confirmed he had tested positive for COVID-19.

On 30 October 2021, he equalled the record for the most games managed in English professional football at 1,601 with a 2–0 loss to Birmingham City. Three days later he broke the record in the next match, a 3–1 loss away to Luton Town. On 6 November 2021, Warnock left Middlesbrough by mutual consent with the club having already identified his replacement. His assistants Kevin Blackwell and Ronnie Jepson also left the club.

On 9 April 2022, Warnock announced his retirement from management after 42 years in the dugout.

Return to Huddersfield Town
Ten months later, 74-year-old Warnock came out of retirement on 13 February 2023 after he was appointed manager of Huddersfield Town until the end of the 2022–23 season, returning as manager of the club 30 years after his initial appointment. He officially took charge of the club on 16 February 2023. His first game in charge was a 2–1 win over Birmingham City.

Personal life
Warnock was born in Sheffield, West Riding of Yorkshire. He has been a lifelong supporter of Sheffield United. He is married to Sharon and has four children, James, Natalie, Amy and William. , he lived in Richmond, London, and as of April 2020 he had a home near Stoke Climsland, Cornwall.

Warnock was in favour of Britain leaving the European Union. In a press conference after a Cardiff City game in January 2019, he remarked that: "I can't wait to get out of it, if I'm honest. I think we'll be far better out of the bloody thing. In every aspect. Football-wise as well, absolutely. To hell with the rest of the world."

Warnock is portrayed by Antony Byrne in the 2022 television film Floodlights, centred on Bury defender Andy Woodward.

Honours
 Burton Albion
 NPL Challenge Cup: 1984–85

Scarborough
Football Conference: 1986–87

Notts County
Football League Second Division play-off winners: 1990–91
Football League Third Division play-off winners: 1989–90

Huddersfield Town
Football League Second Division play-off winners: 1994–95

Plymouth Argyle
Football League Third Division play-off winners: 1995–96

Sheffield United
Football League Championship runners-up: 2005–06

Queens Park Rangers
Football League Championship: 2010–11

Cardiff City
Football League Championship runners-up: 2017–18

Individual
Hartlepool United Player of the Year, 1971–72 season
Football Conference Manager of the Month: November 1986, December 1986
Football Conference Manager of the Year: 1986–87
EFL Championship Manager of the Month: December 2004, August 2005, September 2005, December 2008, August 2010, September 2010, March 2016, August 2017, February 2018, March 2018, October 2020
BBC London Sports Personality of the Year: 2011
LMA Special Achievement Award: 2017-18

Managerial statistics

References

External links

1948 births
Living people
Footballers from Sheffield
English footballers
Association football wingers
Chesterfield F.C. players
Rotherham United F.C. players
Hartlepool United F.C. players
Scunthorpe United F.C. players
Aldershot F.C. players
Barnsley F.C. players
York City F.C. players
Crewe Alexandra F.C. players
English Football League players
English football managers
Gainsborough Trinity F.C. managers
Burton Albion F.C. managers
Scarborough F.C. managers
Notts County F.C. managers
Torquay United F.C. managers
Huddersfield Town A.F.C. managers
Plymouth Argyle F.C. managers
Oldham Athletic A.F.C. managers
Bury F.C. managers
Sheffield United F.C. managers
Crystal Palace F.C. managers
Queens Park Rangers F.C. managers
Leeds United F.C. managers
Rotherham United F.C. managers
Cardiff City F.C. managers
Premier League managers
English Football League managers
National League (English football) managers
Queens Park Rangers F.C. non-playing staff
Middlesbrough F.C. managers